Isebania or Isibania may refer to any of the following:

 Isebania, Kenya, a town in Migori County, Kenya
 Isebania, Tanzania, a town in Tarime District, Tanzania